The 1884 United States presidential election in New Jersey took place on November 4, 1884, as part of the 1884 United States presidential election. Voters chose nine representatives, or electors to the Electoral College, who voted for president and vice president.

New Jersey voted for the Democratic nominee, Grover Cleveland, over the Republican nominee, James G. Blaine. Cleveland won his birth state by a very narrow margin of 1.67 percentage points.

Results

References

New Jersey
1884
1884 New Jersey elections